World Expo Museum Station is the name of a station on Line 13 of the Shanghai Metro. It was previously known as Lupu Bridge Station. It opened on 19 December 2015.

References 

(Chinese) 卢浦大桥站建设工程竣工规划验收合格证

Railway stations in Shanghai
Line 13, Shanghai Metro
Shanghai Metro stations in Huangpu District
Railway stations in China opened in 2015